Melbourne is a township municipality located in Le Val-Saint-François Regional County Municipality in the Estrie region of Quebec, Canada.

Demographics 

Mother tongue (2011)

Notable people
 

Marie-Claire Blais (1939–2021), writer and novelist

See also
List of township municipalities in Quebec

References

External links

 Municipality of Township of Melbourne (in English)

Incorporated places in Estrie
Township municipalities in Quebec